Liu Yijun (born 12 June 1970) is a Chinese actor. He graduated from the Beijing Film Academy. Liu is known for his television roles in The Disguiser (2015), Nirvana in Fire (2015) and Surgeons (2017); and has been nominated for the Golden Eagle Awards and Magnolia Awards.

Filmography

Film

Television series

Awards and nominations

References 

1970 births
Male actors from Xi'an
Living people
Chinese male film actors
Chinese male television actors
Beijing Film Academy alumni
21st-century Chinese male actors